Dru Anthony Yearwood (born 17 February 2000) is an English professional footballer who plays as a midfielder for the New York Red Bulls of Major League Soccer. He is a product of the Arsenal and Southend United youth systems and began his senior career with Southend. He further played one season for Brentford.

Early life
Yearwood was born in Harlow, Essex. He is of Barbadian descent, through his father.

Club career

Southend United
After spending four years with the Arsenal academy, Yearwood moved to the Southend United youth system at the age of 11 and graduated to the first team squad in July 2017, when he signed a four-year professional contract. He was a regular member of the team during the 2017–18 and 2018–19 League One seasons and he was nominated for the LFE Apprentice of the Year award at the 2018 EFL Awards.

Brentford
Yearwood signed for Championship club Brentford on 5 August 2019, on a four-year contract, with the option of a further year, for an undisclosed fee. Throughout the 2019–2020 season and Brentford's promotion push, Yearwood only made two appearances in the league and three other appearances in the Cups. He left the club after one season in a bid to further his career and play more games.

New York Red Bulls
On 5 August 2020 it was announced that Yearwood joined Major League Soccer club New York Red Bulls. Yearwood was signed on a Young Designated Player deal. Yearwood made his debut for the Red Bulls coming on as a substitute in a 3–0 loss against the Philadelphia Union. On 11 September 2021, Yearwood scored his first senior goal in a 1–1 draw against DC United. On 24 July 2022, Yearwood scored his first of the season and assisted on another goal for New York in a 4-3 victory over Austin FC. For his efforts during the match, Yearwood was named to the MLS Team of the Week.  On 2 August 2022, Yearwood opened the scoring for New York in a 4-5 loss to Colorado Rapids.  On 9 September 2022, Yearwood was fined and suspended for four games following an incident at the end of a match against the Philadelphia Union on September 3rd where, in a moment of frustration, he kicked the ball into the stands that subsequently struck a fan in the face. Yearwood apologized for his actions via the team's Twitter account.

International career
Yearwood was born in England and is of Barbadian descent. He was called up to represent the Barbados national team for a friendly against Saint Lucia in 2016, but did not make an appearance. Yearwood was called into the England U18 squad for the 2018 Panda Cup, but a hamstring injury prevented his participation.

Career statistics

Honours
Individual
Southend United Player of the Month: February 2018, March 2018

References

External links

2000 births
Living people
Sportspeople from Harlow
English footballers
Association football midfielders
Southend United F.C. players
Brentford F.C. players
New York Red Bulls players
New York Red Bulls II players
English Football League players
Major League Soccer players
USL Championship players
Designated Players (MLS)
English expatriate footballers
Expatriate soccer players in the United States
English expatriate sportspeople in the United States
English sportspeople of Barbadian descent